This is a list of lakes and ponds in the U.S. state of New Hampshire. The New Hampshire Department of Environmental Services lists 944 lakes and impoundments in their Official List of Public Waters. The water bodies that are listed include natural lakes and reservoirs, including areas on rivers impounded behind dams.

Wikipedia articles have been written about the following New Hampshire lakes:

References

Lakes
New Hampshire